The CSR Ziyang SDA1 is a high-powered diesel-electric locomotive manufactured by CSR Ziyang and later CRRC Ziyang, China in association with MTU Friedrichshafen, for use in Australia.

History and design
In September 2010, CSR Ziyang won a 100 million yuan order to supply SCT Logistics with six locomotives for use on transcontinental trains in Australia. This was the first export of a Chinese-built locomotive to Australia. Four more locomotives were ordered in March 2011. The first locomotive was unveiled on 22 July 2011 at Ziyang.

The locomotives passed their introductory tests on 5 March 2012, allowing operations on mainline routes in Australia to commence. On 16 March 2012 two locomotives successfully hauled a  train on a 1% grade, completing SCT's tests.

Bradken ordered two locomotives in December 2011 for haulage of iron ore. The order was later increased to four. After a period of storage at East Greta, they were then moved to Broadmeadow yard to be used on Qube Logistics container trains from Sandgate to Port Botany with the 1100s. Both were sold to SCT Logistics in January 2017.

Qube Logistics ordered six in January 2013 as the QBX class with all delivered in March 2015.

In October 2013, the entire fleet was withdrawn from service and quarantined, after white asbestos was found in the engine area. This is despite the locomotives being certified as asbestos free. By January 2014, remediation work had been carried out and most of the class was already back in service.

In mid 2021 SCT Logistics ordered 12 more SDA1s from CRRC Ziyang with the first two being delivered in July and two more in December.

Summary

See also
CSR Qishuyan SDA2, Cape gauge single cab variant

References

External links

CSR Ziyang Locomotive Co., Ltd. locomotives
Diesel-electric locomotives of Australia
Railway locomotives introduced in 2012
Standard gauge locomotives of Australia